Andrew Ewbank Burn (17 January 1864 – 28 November 1927) was an English clergyman in the Church of England, Dean of Salisbury from 1920 until his death in 1927.

Born in Bareilly  on 17 January 1864 and educated at Charterhouse and Trinity College, Cambridge, Andrew Burn was ordained into the priesthood in 1888. His first posts were curacies at St Cuthbert, Bensham and St Andrew, Auckland after which he was Rector of Kynnersley, Rural Dean of Edgmond, a Prebendary of Lichfield Cathedral and an Honorary Chaplain to the King before his elevation to the Deanery. An eminent theologian, he died on 28 November 1927.

His son in law was later Bishop of Madras.

Works
Niceta of Remesiana, His Life and Works, 1905
The Athanasian Creed and its early Commentaries, 1906
The Crown of Thorns, 1911
The Council of Nicaea: a memorial for its sixteenth centenary, 1926

References

External links

1864 births
People from Bareilly
People educated at Charterhouse School
Alumni of Trinity College, Cambridge
Honorary Chaplains to the King
Deans of Salisbury
1927 deaths